Robert Chambers (11 December 1899 – 1972) was an English professional association footballer. He played for five clubs in the Football League in the 1920s, as well as playing non-league football with Carlisle United.

References

External links

English footballers
Association football defenders
Lincoln City F.C. players
Burnley F.C. players
Rotherham United F.C. players
Carlisle United F.C. players
Exeter City F.C. players
New Brighton A.F.C. players
English Football League players
1899 births
1972 deaths